The Golden State Warriors are an American professional basketball team based in San Francisco, California. The franchise had been known as the Philadelphia Warriors and the San Francisco Warriors, due to it previously being based in or near those cities. The team is a member of the Pacific Division of the Western Conference in the National Basketball Association (NBA). The Warriors initially joined the Basketball Association of America (BAA) as the Philadelphia Warriors in 1946, and won the first BAA championship title in the same year under coach Eddie Gottlieb. The Warriors later joined the NBA at its foundation in 1949. The Warriors' record was 26–42 in their first NBA season and lost in the first round of the playoffs to the Syracuse Nationals. Franklin Mieuli and the Diners Club put together a group of 40 local investors to move the Warriors to San Francisco before the 1962–63 NBA season, with Mieuli eventually buying all the shares of the franchise to keep the team from collapsing and to keep it in the area. The team became the Golden State Warriors and moved to Oakland before the 1971–72 NBA season.

There have been 25 head coaches for the Warriors franchise. The franchise won their first NBA championship as the Philadelphia Warriors in the 1956 NBA Finals, and were coached by George Senesky. Their second title was won as the Golden State Warriors in 1975, under coach Al Attles, who played with and coached the Warriors for 25 seasons. He is also the franchise's all-time leader in regular season games coached and wins.

Frank McGuire is one of the members of the franchise that has been inducted into the Basketball Hall of Fame as coaches, while being the only one to do so that has spent his whole career with the franchise. Alex Hannum, Don Nelson, and Bill Sharman are the only other members of the franchise that have been inducted into the Hall of Fame. Hannum,  Nelson, and Kerr have both received the NBA Coach of the Year award once. Nelson has also been named one of the top 10 coaches in NBA history. Four former players for the Warriors, Attles, Johnston, George Lee, and Senesky went on to coach for the franchise.

Key

Coaches

Notes
 A running total of the number of coaches of the Warriors. Thus, any coach who has two separate terms as head coach is only counted once.
 Each year is linked to an article about that particular NBA season.

References
General

Specific

Lists of National Basketball Association head coaches by team

Head coaches